FC Gossau is a Swiss football club from the city of Gossau in the canton of St. Gallen. It currently plays in the Challenge League, the second-highest level of Swiss football.

History
After its foundation in 1906, FC Gossau spent the first 65 years of its history in almost entire unimportance. This changed in 1971 when they advanced for the first time to the 1. Liga (third level) by a 3–0 victory against FC Widnau. Between 1975 and 1978, they even managed to reach the promotion to the second level (NLB). Changeful years followed, the Club played mostly in the 1. or 2. Liga.

After another relegation to the 2. Liga in 1987, Roger Heri composed a new team and induced the "second bloom" of the FC Gossau in the nineties. In 1992, they achieved the promotion to the 1. Liga, after victories against FC Solothurn and FC Monthey they even got to the second level in 1993. Despite  seven clubs being relegated, they managed to remain in the NLB because they defeated FC Chiasso in the play-offs. However, in the following season they failed to avoid relegation. Under the management of Heinz Bigler, the team defeated Ascona and AC Bellinzona in the play-offs and made it to reascend to NLB.

However, the last second level membership of FC Gossau so far (season 1996/97) lasted merely one season. While heading the table after the fifth matchday, the team afterwards fell back to the last place but one until winter break. Neither a change of manager nor the engagement of several new players caused the looked-for staying in the league. Thereafter, FC Gossau played with changing successes in the 1. Liga until 2006/2007 when they managed to reach the promotion again.

The club hit the headlines when they defeated the favourite FC St. Gallen in the Swiss Cup by 2–0 in 2007.

According to rumors, the club faces allegations to be involved in match-fixing during season 2008/09. Sources believe that a former goalkeeper and a defender, still member of the squad, were bribed by a betting gang. and released on 23 November 2009 Mario Bigoni in the course of the 2009 European football betting scandal.

In May 2010, former players Marc Lütolf, Mario Bigoni, Darko Damjanović were given open-ended suspensions.

Former coaches
 Vlado Nogic (2005–2009)
 Hans Kodric (2009)

Current squad
As of 2 November, 2021.

Notable former players

References

External links
 Official site 
 Swiss Football League profile 
 soccerway profile

 
Football clubs in Switzerland
Association football clubs established in 1906
1906 establishments in Switzerland